Seventh Day Baptist Cemetery is a cemetery located on Upson Road in Burlington, Connecticut which dates back to the late 18th century. It was used as a burial ground for members of the Seventh Day Baptist Church. The cemetery has mistakenly been referred to as "Burlington Center Cemetery" but is known to locals as Green Lady Cemetery, due to a ghost that is purported to haunt the grounds.

History
The Seventh Day Baptists (or Sabbatarians) were a religious group that originated in Rhode Island. Many of them were descendants of the Roger Williams colony. In the late 18th century, approximately 20 families migrated from Rhode Island to West Britain, Connecticut (present-day Burlington) and established the Seventh Day Baptist Church on September 18, 1780. At the meeting of the Seventh Day Baptist Society on October 12, 1796, a deed was presented by Jared Covey (the benefactor of the church) to the other members detailing a "parcel of land laying at the south east corner of the ninth lot in the fourth division in Bristol containing about half an acre for the purpose of a public burying ground". The site had already been used as a burial ground, beginning in 1780 with the burial of John Davis, but it was in 1796 when it was officially declared as Seventh Day Baptist Cemetery.

During the years between 1810 and 1820, a number of accidental deaths plagued the Seventh Day Baptists. One member fell off a ladder and died while repairing his house, while another died when a recently dug well collapsed on him.  Another was hanged while repairing a lamp in her home, and yet another was killed when a tree fell on him in the woods. While these bizarre deaths may have been legitimate accidents, some people believe it is possible the early Burlington residents may have had a secret agenda toward forcing the Sabbatarians from the area, eventually managing to confiscate their lands and properties.  By 1820, the last of the Seventh Day Baptists departed Burlington, and migrated to Brookfield, New York in Madison County, never to return to the area. The last person to be interred in the cemetery was Charlotte Spencer on October 14, 1881.

Legend of The Green Lady 
The cemetery is known by locals by the name of Green Lady Cemetery, due to purported sightings of a green spectral figure known as the Green Lady. Many believe the lady in the mist to be the ghost of a Seventh Day Baptist named Elisabeth Palmiter. 

According to local legend, in April 1800, Elisabeth's husband Benjamin went into town to get some supplies. He suddenly found himself engulfed in a bad snow storm. Benjamin decided to stay in town, and wait for the weather to subside. According to the story, when he didn't return right away, Elisabeth went out to search for him. After getting lost in the fury of the storm, she drowned in one of the nearby swamps.

What happened next has some variation. In one version of the story, Benjamin returned home to find his wife missing. Frantic, he looked for her, and after an exhaustive search, he found her frozen body in a swamp, and she was wearing a pretty green dress. In other versions of the story, Benjamin was either unwilling to save Elisabeth, or murdered her himself, and threw her body into the swamp. Since this is a local legend, no one is absolutely certain what actually occurred.

Regardless, many people walking near the cemetery at night have claimed to have seen a female apparition surrounded in a green mist. According to most accounts, she merely appears without provocation or pattern, smiles and then dissipates. Some people have also claimed to see mysterious lights, looking like a flashlight or lantern carried by an unseen person. Some believe it could be the ghost of Benjamin Palmiter, perpetually searching for Elisabeth in the swamp. During the early 1990s there were reports of satanic rituals being performed in the woods directly across the street from the cemetery.  In 1996, two CCSU students stumbled across a giant stone altar in the woods, that was approximately 4' tall and solid stone and approximately 2 1/2' X 4' across the top. In front of the altar were four rows of round decaying wooden benches, that were rounded and built into the hill, facing the altar. One of the students was injured tripping over the top bench as they went down the hill. After visiting the stone altar, the students reported hearing a cacophony of voices telling them to "GET OUT! GET OUT! GET OUT!" They ran out of the woods and fled from the cemetery, vowing never to return.

A paranormal researcher reported being tapped on the shoulder in December 2015 while searching for the altar in the woods, and also reported hearing shrieking noises. In 2016, tourists reported that they heard a loud hum coming from the woods.

Present

Today, there are no full standing headstones, due to vandalism that took place in the 1970s and again in 2010, and also as a result of weathering. The only standing headstone was that of Elisabeth Palmiter, and that stone remained in the cemetery until 2010. Sometime between 7:30am on July 20 and 11am on July 21, some individuals stole the 200-pound headstone of Elisabeth Palmiter. This was a roughly 200 pound grave marker that was re-dedicated to the site in the 1970s, following the removal of all vandalized pieces of the original stones. The cemetery is now private property (owned by the New Britain Public Works) and the Burlington police and local residents usually patrol the area at night to guard against further vandalism.  Visiting the site during the day for the purpose of historical research is permitted.

References

 Joseph A. Citro. Weird New England. Sterling Publishing Co., 2005
 Cheri Revai. Haunted Connecticut. Stackpole Books, 2006
 David E. Philips "The Green Lady of Burlington." Legendary Connecticut. Curbstone Press, 2001
 Joanna Mechlinski. "‘Green Lady’ lures a video producer." The Bristol Press. October 30, 2005
 Grim Hauntings Or Skeptics Truth. "Seventh Day Baptist Cemetery", Creepy Connecticut. February 7, 2005.

Burlington, Connecticut
Reportedly haunted locations in Connecticut
History of Connecticut
Seventh Day Baptists
Cemeteries in Hartford County, Connecticut
Baptist cemeteries in the United States
Baptist Christianity in Connecticut